Asaphodes glaciata is a species of moth in the family Geometridae. This species is endemic to New Zealand. This moth has only be found in Westland in the areas near Fox and Franz Josef Glaciers. Adults of this species are on the wing in January.

Taxonomy
This species was described by George Hudson in 1925 as Xanthorhoe glaciata using material collected by Charles E. Clarke at Mount Moltke in Westland in January at 1700m. Hudson also discussed and illustrated this species under this name in his 1928 publication The Butterflies and Moths of New Zealand. In 1987 Robin C. Craw proposed assigning this species to the genus Asaphodes. In 1988 John S. Dugdale agreed with this proposal. The holotype specimen is held at the Auckland War Memorial Museum.

Description
 
Hudson described the species as follows:

Distribution

This species is endemic to New Zealand. A. glaciata can only be found in Westland around the Fox and Franz Josef Glaciers.

Biology and life cycle
A. glaciata is on the wing in January.

References

Moths described in 1925
Moths of New Zealand
Larentiinae
Endemic fauna of New Zealand
Taxa named by George Hudson
Endemic moths of New Zealand